Apoorva Sagodharargal may refer to:

 Apoorva Sagodharargal (1989 film), a 1989 Tamil film directed by Singeetham Srinivasa Rao
 Apoorva Sagodharargal (1949 film), a 1949 Tamil film